Chantek (December 17, 1977 – August 7, 2017), born at the Yerkes National Primate Research Center in Atlanta, Georgia, was a male hybrid Sumatran/Bornean orangutan who mastered the use of a number of intellectual skills, including American Sign Language (ASL), taught by American anthropologists Lyn Miles and Ann Southcombe. In Malay and Indonesian, cantik (pronounced chanteek) means "lovely" or "beautiful".

Early life

Born at the Yerkes National Primate Research Center, Chantek was transferred to the University of Tennessee at Chattanooga (UTC) when he was nine months old.   Miles was the director of a research project to study apes, and she and a few student volunteers cared for him the first several months after his arrival. Dr. Miles taught him his first signs, "food-eat" and "drink". Soon after this her teaching schedule made it necessary to hire an assistant, Ann Southcombe. Ann had experience raising seven baby gorillas at the Cincinnati Zoo and was the first "mother" and "teacher" for Michael, the young gorilla companion to Koko, the first signing gorilla.  Under the direction of Dr. Miles, Chantek was raised much as a human child yet also had time to be an orangutan.  Ann toilet trained Chantek, much as she did Michael. He was given chores, like pick up his toys or sit for a signing test for which he was given an allowance, using steel washers as money.

After years of service, she hired a full-time assistant to give Chantek all the benefits of early education. As Miles taught anthropology at UTC, she also gathered a group of dedicated student volunteers to help with the project, such as Warren Roberts, who now teaches anthropology classes at the college as of Spring 2017. 

Chantek spent almost nine years living under constant supervision in a specially adapted trailer on the UTC campus. He went to classes regularly and was so beloved by the academic community that his photo was included in the school yearbooks. However, as his size increased, and as containing him in his compound became a problem, the administration feared an accident, and they returned him to Yerkes following an incident in which he escaped from his compound and caught a female student by surprise by prohibiting her from retreating in a test of strengths with the student. For the next eleven years of his life, he was confined to a small cage, where he entered a depression and put on weight due to his inactive lifestyle at Yerkes. When his caretakers were permitted to visit, he continually signed for them to get car keys and take him home. Finally, in 1997, the Zoo Atlanta offered him sanctuary in an enclosure with trees for swinging from branch to branch (brachiation).

Later years and death
In 2013, Animal Planet aired a documentary about Chantek's life and experience. The show, a part of their A Wild Affair series, was titled "The Ape That Went to College." His former caretaker Lyn would visit him, and he would still use signs especially when she was present. Although he never had soda, ice cream, cheeseburgers, or candy in 10 years, he asked for them in sign language. On August 7, 2017, Chantek died of heart disease at the age of 39.

Chantek resided at Zoo Atlanta in one of their orangutan enclosures with a small group of other orangutans. He enjoyed painting, stringing beads, and constructing things. He was shy and quiet but attentively listened and was highly observant of his surroundings.

Intellect
Chantek had a vocabulary of around 150 modified ASL signs, and he also understood spoken English.  Chantek made and used tools and even understood the concepts of money and work-exchange. He possessed the spatial comprehension to direct a driving-route from the University of Tennessee at Chattanooga (UTC) to the closest Dairy Queen, and the mental comprehension to refer to events that happened years ago.  He was a huge fan of the country basket at Dairy Queen and enjoyed many Dilly bars. He enjoyed creative projects and made paintings, necklaces, and music.

Like children, Chantek preferred to use names rather than pronouns – as the reference is fixed – even when talking to a person.  He even invented signs of his own (e.g. 'eye-drink' for contact lens solution, and 'Dave Missing Finger' for a special friend). He developed referential ability as early as most human children, and pointed to objects just like humans do. Chantek used adjectives to specify attributes, such as "orange dogs" when he referred to orangutans unfamiliar to him.

Chantek also demonstrated self-awareness, by grooming himself in a mirror and by using signs in mental planning and deception. Rather than simply exhibiting conditioned responses, as critics of primate intellect contend, Chantek learned roles – and role reversals – in games like 'Simon Says'. Like many other orangutans who have demonstrated problem solving skills, Chantek exhibited certain intuitive and thinking character traits comparable to the rationality used in human engineering. His intellectual and linguistic abilities made some scientists, including Miles and Dawn Prince-Hughes, regard him as possessing personhood.

Orangutan personhood and conservation

The term personhood is often ascribed by experts to animals who demonstrate conscious awareness, language, and acculturation. Miles and like-minded advocates seek to expand personhood to great apes, to the extent that—eventually—legal rights of personhood would be conferred under the law.

To accomplish this goal, Miles created Project Chantek, to further study the mind of the orangutan. She hopes her research will help ascertain how human symbolic systems evolved and developed. Uniquely, her project emphasizes development of cultural models and processes in Chantek's upbringing. Her work is supported by the Chantek Foundation, whose mission is to develop greater scientific understanding of orangutans, to support cultural and language research with orangutans, to promote orangutan conservation and establish culture-based great ape sanctuaries, thereby building a bridge of understanding between humans and great apes.

The Chantek Foundation is a member of ApeNet, founded by musician Peter Gabriel to link great apes through the internet, creating the first interspecies internet communication. The project was cancelled.

See also
 Birutė Galdikas
 Great ape language
 Primate cognition
 Jeffrey H. Schwartz
 List of individual apes
 The Mind of an Ape
 Theory of mind

References

External links 
 FAQs at Chantek Foundation web site
 The Ape Who Went to College – documentary on Chantek
 OrionSociety.org  – 'Does an Orangutan find Freedom in the Gift of Words?  Do We?', Susanne Antonetta (March, 2005)
 CNN.com – 'Gifted orangutan lets his fingers do the talking', CNN (November 28, 1997)
 Orangutan.org – Orangutan Foundation International

1977 animal births
2017 animal deaths
Individual primates in the United States
Apes from language studies
Individual orangutans